Wang Zhong (1745–1794) was a Qing-dynasty Chinese scholar from Jiangdu District in Yangzhou. He has been characterised as "the most arrogant scholar of his age".

Works
 Guangling dui (廣陵對, Answers about Guangling), 1787
 Shu xue (Records of Learning), 1792
 Guangling tongdian (Comprehensive Standard Work of Guanling), published posthumously, 1823

References

1745 births
1794 deaths
Chinese scholars